Mercy is leniency or compassion.  In sport, the mercy rule may be applied.  

Mercy may also refer to:

Places 
 Mercy Bay, Northwest Territories, Canada
 Mercy, Allier, Allier department, France, a commune
 Mercy, Yonne, Yonne department, France, a commune
 Mercy, Les Cayes, Haiti, a village in the Les Cayes municipality
 Mercy Reef, Miami, Florida, United States, an artificial reef

Arts and entertainment

Fictional characters 
 Mercy (comics), a villain at the Marvel Comics universe
 Mercy, a character in the 1979 film, The Warriors
 Mercy Bromage, a character from the 2017 movie My Days of Mercy
 Mercy Chant, a minor character in the Thomas Hardy novel Tess of the d'Urbervilles
 Mercy Graves, a character from Superman: The Animated Series
 Mercy Hartigan, the human accomplice of the Cybermen in The Next Doctor
 Mercy Olubunmi, in the British soap opera EastEnders and Internet spin-off EastEnders: E20
 Mercy Thompson, in an urban fantasy series written by Patricia Briggs
 Mercy (Overwatch), from the 2016 video game Overwatch

Fictional places 
 Mercy, Saskatchewan, the setting for the Canadian sitcom Little Mosque on the Prairie

Film 
 Mercy (1953 film), a Mexican drama
 Mercy (1995 film), a thriller written and directed by Richard Shepard
 Mercy (2000 film), a thriller directed by Damian Harris
 Mercy (2009 film), a romantic drama directed by Patrick Hoelck
 Mercy (2012 film), a German film
 Mercy (2014 film), an American horror film
 Mercy (2016 film), a home invasion thriller
 Mercy (2017 film), a drama romance film
 The Mercy, a 2017 British film directed by James Marsh

Games 
 Mercy (game), a children's game that involves the bending back of an opponent's hands
 Mercy, a move related to the Fatality in the video game series Mortal Kombat

Literature 
 Mercy (Vertigo), a graphic novel in DC Comics' Vertigo imprint
 A Mercy, a 2008 novel by Toni Morrison
 Mercy (novel), a 1996 novel by Jodi Picoult
 Mercy, a 1991 book by Andrea Dworkin

Music 
Mercy (band), a 1960s pop group

Albums 
Mercy (Steve Jones album), 1987
Mercy, by Bryan Duncan, 1992
Mercy, by Andraé Crouch, 1994
mercy (Meredith Monk album), 2002
Mercy (Salmonella Dub remix album), 2004
Mercy (Burden Brothers album), 2006
Mercy (Planes Mistaken for Stars album), 2006
Mercy (Rocco DeLuca and the Burden album), 2009
Mercy, by Natalie Bergman, 2021
mercy (Trey Anastasio album), 2022
Mercy (John Cale album), 2023

Songs 
"Mercy" (Brett Young song)
"Mercy" (Dave Matthews Band song)
"Mercy" (Duffy song)
"Mercy" (Elevation Worship and Maverick City Music song) 
"Mercy" (GOOD Music song)
"Mercy" (Madame Monsieur song)
"Mercy" (Muse song)
"Mercy" (Shawn Mendes song)
"Mercy" (Kanye West song)

Television 
 Mercy (TV series), an American medical drama
 "Mercy" (The Walking Dead), an episode

Organizations
 Mercy (healthcare organization), a Catholic health system in the United States sponsored by the Sisters of Mercy
 Mercy Malaysia, a Malaysia-based relief group
 Mercy Ministries, a Charity organization

Schools
 Mercy College (disambiguation)
 Mercy High School (disambiguation)
 Mercy Academy, an all-girls Roman Catholic high school in Louisville, Kentucky

People
 Mercy (given name), a list of people with the given name or nickname

Other uses 
 Mercy Hospital (disambiguation)
 , three United States Navy hospital ships
 Mercy-class hospital ship
 Mercy (cipher), a disk encryption algorithm
 Mercy (drink), a hangover preventative beverage
 Waylon Mercy, later stage name for former professional wrestler Dan Spivey
 Mercy, Indonesian slang for a Mercedes-Benz car

See also 
 La Mercy, a suburb of the eThekwini municipality, South Africa
 "Mercy, Mercy, Mercy", a 1966 jazz instrumental written by Joe Zawinul for Julian "Cannonball" Adderley
 "Mercy, Mercy" (Don Covay song), a 1965 soul song
 "Aw' Mercy", a song by Booker T. & the M.G.'s from the album Soul Dressing
 Mercy-le-Bas, in the Meurthe-et-Moselle department
 Mercy-le-Haut, in the Meurthe-et-Moselle department
 Val-de-Mercy, in the Yonne department